The Charles MacCallum House is a single-family home located at 1227 West Sugnet Street in Midland, Michigan. It was listed on the National Register of Historic Places in 1989.

History
Dr. Charles MacCallum was a Midland physician, In early 1935, he asked Alden Dow to design a house to place on a lot near Midland Country Club's golf course. After several design iterations, Dow produced plans for this house. Erection began in December 1935, by the Bay City Stone Company; the house was completed in 1936.

Description
The Charles MacCallum house is a brick structure set out in an asymmetrical L shape, with a smaller, taller section pointing toward the road and a longer leg running parallel. A long entryway is sheltered underneath a broad overhanging roof.

References

		
National Register of Historic Places in Midland County, Michigan
Prairie School architecture
Houses completed in 1936
Alden B. Dow buildings
Midland, Michigan